Angharad Jane James (born 1 June 1994) is a professional footballer who plays as a midfielder for Tottenham Hotspur in the English Women's Super league  and the Wales national team.

James has previously played for English FA Women's Super League clubs Arsenal, Bristol Academy, Notts County, Yeovil Town, Everton, and Reading before moving to America to join North Carolina Courage in the National Women's Soccer League. Internationally, James has represented Wales since her debut in 2011 and was named Women's Players' Player of the Year for Wales in 2017 having previously been twice named Wales Women's Young Player of the Year in 2013 and 2014.

At 28, James is the youngest ever Wales player to accrue 100 Caps for her country.

On 11 December 2022 she reached the 150 mark for Women's Super League appearances.

Club career

Arsenal
James joined the Arsenal Academy in 2010 at the age of 16, after playing for Manorbier Ladies in her native Pembrokeshire. She made her senior first team debut on 5 October 2011 as a 63rd-minute substitute for Gilly Flaherty in a 6–0 home win over Belarusian side Bobruichanka Bobruisk in the UEFA Champions League round of 32.

Bristol Academy

Ahead of the 2012 FA WSL season, James was signed by Mark Sampson for Bristol Academy. She made her Bristol debut on 22 April 2014 as a 60th-minute substitute for Molly Clarke in a 1–0 home defeat to Lincoln Ladies. On 26 May 2013, James appeared as a halftime substitute for Alex Windell during the 2013 FA Women's Cup Final. Bristol lost 3–0 to Arsenal. James played in 13 of Bristol's 14 league games during the 2013 FA WSL season as the team earned their highest ever finish, runners-up behind Liverpool. The two met on the final day of the season separated by two points with Liverpool winning 2–0 to clinch the title. During the 2015 FA WSL season, James played in all 14 games as the Vixens were relegated. She left following the team's relegation having made 83 appearances in all competitions, scoring six goals. On her departure, Bristol manager Willie Kirk said, "You never want to lose top players, but following relegation it was inevitable that we would lose a few. Angharad played a big part in the club's successes over the past few seasons and at only 21 has bags of potential and can achieve a lot in the game... Angharad made her intentions to stay in WSL1 known to me very quickly so we have been planning for this for a while now."

Notts County
Having stated her desire to remain in the top-flight, James signed for Notts County in March 2016 ahead of the 2016 FA WSL season. She made 18 appearances in 2016. Two days prior to the start of the FA WSL Spring Series in April 2017, Notts County folded, leaving the players without a club.

Yeovil Town
On 16 May 2017, following the folding of Notts County, James signed a short-term one month contract with newly promoted WSL 1 side Yeovil Town for the remainder of the FA WSL Spring Series. She made four appearances and scored one goal in a 2–1 defeat to Sunderland as Yeovil finished bottom.

Everton
In July 2017, James left Yeovil to join newly-promoted Everton ahead of the 2017–18 FA WSL season. She became an integeral part of the team, starting in 43 of her 47 appearances for the club during her two seasons as a Toffee.

Reading
In July 2019, James left Everton to join Reading. On 17 November 2019, James scored her first Reading goal, and her first goal since scoring for Yeovil May 2017, in a 3–3 draw with Bristol City. James captained Reading on 7 October 2020 in their 4–0 win over second division Charlton Athletic in the League Cup group stage in the absence of Natasha Harding. James scored her only other goal for Reading on 23 January 2021 in the third minute of a 2–2 WSL draw with Aston Villa. On 24 February 2021, Reading announced that James had agreed to join North Carolina Courage of the American National Women's Soccer League (NWSL) upon the completion of the 2020–21 FA WSL season in May. She left having made 48 appearances and scored two goals. In her final season with the team, James led the FA WSL in successful tackles with 46 and was one of three outfield players to play all 1,980 minutes along with West Ham's Grace Fisk and Manchester United's Millie Turner.

North Carolina Courage
Having agreed terms in February, James joined North Carolina Courage in May after the end of the 2020–21 FA WSL season. She was named to a matchday squad for the first time on 5 June 2021 as an unused substitute against Chicago Red Stars before eventually debuting two games later on 23 June when she started against Racing Louisville. The Courage won 2–0 with head coach Paul Riley commenting James, "has a great range of passing and a great engine. She plays intelligently with the ball, and for me, she was one of the highlights of the night". James scored her first NWSL goal and only goal for the Courage on 25 September 2021 in a 3–1 defeat away to Gotham FC. James made 17 appearances during her debut NWSL season including one in the playoffs.

Orlando Pride
Having been traded to San Diego Wave FC in exchange for roster protection during the 2022 NWSL Expansion Draft on 8 December 2021, James was subsequently traded to Orlando Pride along with a league record $275,000 in Allocation Money in exchange for Alex Morgan eight days later. The move reunited her with fiancé Amy Turner, the first time since Notts County in 2016 they had been at a club at the same time.

James made her Orlando debut on 19 March 2022 at home to Washington Spirit in the 2022 NWSL Challenge Cup. She would make four further appearances in the Cup competition that year ahead of the regular season opener on 2 May 2022 against Gotham FC where she would make her league debut for Orlando.

On 28 July 2022, James and Orlando agreed to mutually terminate her contract, one month after Amy Turner had had her Orlando contract bought out and returned to England with Tottenham Hotspur.

Tottenham Hotspur 
On 30 July 2022, it was announced that James had once again moved to the same club as her fiancé for the second time in seven months, this time English WSL side Tottenham Hotspur on a two-year deal with the option of a further year.

International

Youth
James previously represented Wales at under-16, under-17 and under-19 level. The team automatically qualified for the 2013 UEFA Women's Under-19 Championship as the host nation, their first appearance at the tournament. Despite the team losing all three group games and failing to score, James' performances earned her a place in 22-player the Squad of the Tournament, Wales' sole representative.

Senior
On 27 October 2011, James made her senior international debut, aged 17, as a late substitute in a 2–2 draw with Scotland at Tynecastle Park during UEFA Women's Euro 2013 qualifying. She scored her first senior international goal on 29 February 2012, a 90+2 minute winner in a 1–0 victory over Portugal at the 2012 Algarve Cup. James earned her 100th International Cap for Wales on 6 September 2022 in a World Cup Qualifier against Slovenia, a game which also saw her Wales team qualify for the World Cup play-offs for the first time in their history.

Great Britain Olympic
In January 2012, James was named on the provisional Great Britain women's Olympic football team longlist for the London 2012 Olympics. James had stated on numerous occasions that if she was selected she would accept a call-up to Team GB.

Personal life
James speaks Welsh, viewing it not only as an expression of her identity but also a tactical advantage when playing English-speaking opposition. Prior to focusing on football, James also played cricket and was capped internationally at under-15 level. She attended Ysgol y Preseli at the same time as fellow Welsh international footballer Joe Allen.

James' father, Clive, played rugby for, and later became head coach of, Narberth RFC.

On 23 December 2020, James announced her engagement to fellow professional footballer Amy Turner.

Career statistics

Club summary

International goals
 As of match played 30 November 2021. Wales score listed first, score column indicates score after each James goal.

Honours
Bristol Academy
FA Women's Super League runner-up: 2013
Women's FA Cup runner-up: 2012–13

Individual
Wales Women's Young Player of the Year: 2013, 2014
Wales Women's Players' Player of the Year: 2017

References

External links
Angharad James at UEFA
Angharad James at Everton

Angharad James at FAW

1994 births
Living people
Sportspeople from Haverfordwest
Arsenal W.F.C. players
Bristol Academy W.F.C. players
Notts County L.F.C. players
Yeovil Town L.F.C. players
Everton F.C. (women) players
Reading F.C. Women players
Women's Super League players
Wales women's international footballers
Welsh women's footballers
Women's association football midfielders
British LGBT footballers
21st-century LGBT people
National Women's Soccer League players
North Carolina Courage players
Orlando Pride players
FIFA Century Club